Class 395 may refer to:

British Rail Class 395
LSWR 395 class